The Loyal Traitor is a children's book written in 1965 by Sylvia Haymon and illustrated by Derek Collard. The story is set during the reign of King Edward VI and centered on the adventures of fictional character Tom Redman. This poor country boy from Wymondham, bears witnesses to the anti-enclosure uprisings and subsequent public execution of Robert Kett.

External links
 Worldcat Catalogue Listing
 National Archives

References

1965 British novels
British children's novels
British historical novels
Children's historical novels
Chatto & Windus books
Novels set in Norfolk
1965 children's books